Andrey Vladimirovich Yatskin (Russian: Андрей Владимирович Яцкин; born on 25 April 1969), is a Russian statesman and politician who is currently the First Deputy Chairman of the Federation Council since 23 September 2020, as well as the Senator of from the executive authority of Rostov Oblast since 21 September 2020.

He is an Acting State Councilor of the Russian Federation, 1st class in 2010, an Honored Lawyer of Russia awarded in 2008, and a Candidate of Law in 2007, and an associate professor.

Biography

Andrey Yatskin was born on 25 April 1969 in Krasnoyarsk.

In 1990, he graduated from the Kurgan Higher Military-Political Aviation School, after which he continued his studies at the Faculty of Law of the Military University of the Ministry of Defense of Russia in Moscow with a degree in jurisprudence, from which he graduated in 1996.

From 1996 to 1999, he worked in the Administrative Department of the Office of the Government of Russia, in which the department controls the activities of law enforcement agencies.

In 1999, he was appointed Assistant to the Russian Prime Minister, Sergei Stepashin. After Stepashin's resignation and Vladimir Putin's appointment as Prime Minister, Yatskin continued to work as his assistant.

In 2000, he graduated from the Russian Academy of Public Administration under the President of Russia, after which, from 2000 to 2003, he worked as Chief of Staff of the Deputy Head of the Administration of the President of Russia Dmitry Kozak, and after his appointment to the post of Head of the Administration of the President of the Russian Federation, he became First Deputy head of his staff. From March 19 to 28 April 2004, he was the Deputy Chief of Staff of the Government of Russia, Kozak.

From 28 April 2004 to 21 September 2020, he worked as the Plenipotentiary Representative of the Government of Russia in the Federation Council. As part of his work in this position, among other things, he periodically presented government awards to members of the upper house of parliament. Since September 2005, he has been a member of the Government Commission for Improving Interaction Between Federal Executive Bodies and Executive Bodies of the Subjects of Russia.

On 11 January 2009, he was awarded the class rank of Acting State Councilor of Russia, 2nd class, and on 14 May 2010, Acting State Councilor of the Russia, 1st class.

On 13 April 2020, by order of Prime Minister Mikhail Mishustin, Yatskin was also entrusted with the temporary duties of the Plenipotentiary Representative of the Government of the Russia in the State Duma.

On 21 September 2020, by decree of the Governor of Rostov Oblast, Vasily Golubev, who was re-elected to his post on the Single Voting Day on 13 September 2020, Tarskin became the Senator of Rostov Oblast, representing the executive authority of the region, replacing Vladimir Lakunin. His term will end in September 2025.

On 23 September 2020, Yatskin was appointed the First Deputy Chairman of the Federation Council. His candidacy for this post was proposed by the Chairman of the Federation Council, Valentina Matviyenko. On the same day, Andrey Turchak, who previously held the position of Deputy Chairman of the Federation Council, was elected to a similar post as First Deputy Chairman of the Federation Council.

Teaching and scientific activity

In 2007, he defended his dissertation on the topic "Legal regulation of administrative reform in modern Russia" at the Institute of State and Law of the Russian Academy of Sciences, becoming a candidate of legal sciences.

Since 2007, he has been teaching at the National Research University Higher School of Economics, as an associate professor at the Department of Business Law of the Faculty of Law.

References

1969 births
Living people
1st class Active State Councillors of the Russian Federation
United Russia politicians
Russian individuals subject to European Union sanctions
Members of the Federation Council of Russia (after 2000)
Russian Presidential Academy of National Economy and Public Administration alumni